The 2017 FireKeepers Casino 400 is a Monster Energy NASCAR Cup Series race held on June 18, 2017 at Michigan International Speedway in Brooklyn, Michigan. Contested over 200 laps on the  D-shaped oval, it will be the 15th race of the 2017 Monster Energy NASCAR Cup Series season.

Report

Background

The race will be held at Michigan International Speedway, a  moderate-banked D-shaped speedway located in Brooklyn, Michigan. The track is used primarily for NASCAR events. It is sometimes known as a "sister track" to Texas World Speedway, and was used as the basis of Auto Club Speedway. The track is owned by International Speedway Corporation. Michigan International Speedway is recognized as one of motorsports' premier facilities because of its wide racing surface and high banking (by open-wheel standards; the 18-degree banking is modest by stock car standards).

Entry list

 Ryan Reed on standby if Bayne is unable to race due to the birth of Ashton and Trevor's second child.

First practice

Qualifying

Qualifying results

Practice (post-qualifying)

Second practice

Final practice

Race

First stage
Kyle Larson led the field to the green flag at 3:20 p.m. There were reports early on of trash bags circulating in the air, with one landing on the front stretch and bringing out a caution on the seventh lap. Due to the timing of the early caution, NASCAR decided to move the scheduled competition caution back five laps from it would've originally flown on lap 20.

Back to green on lap 11, this run was a short 14-lap burst that concluded with the competition caution on lap 25.

Four laps after the lap 30 restart, Martin Truex Jr. passed Larson going into Turn 3 to take the lead and drove on to win the stage on lap 60. Caution flew moments later for the conclusion of the stage. Larson returned to the lead under the caution when he exited pit road first. During this run, Erik Jones was running in the top-10 when he made an unscheduled stop for a loose wheel on lap 41.

Second stage
After going back to green on lap 68, the race settled into a green flag run that lasted the entire length of the stage that was only broken up by green flag stops starting on lap 107. Larson pitted from the lead the following lap, followed by Kyle Busch three laps later, giving the lead to Brad Keselowski. He pitted on lap 113 and the lead cycled back to Larson.

As was the case in the first stage, Truex passed Larson exiting Turn 4 to retake the lead on lap 116, drove on to win the second stage on lap 120 and caution flew for the end of the stage. Unlike the first stage, Truex beat Larson off pit road to maintain the lead.

Final stage

The race settled into another green flag run after the restart on lap 128, which was disrupted by Ryan Sieg spinning out, in front of race leader Truex, in Turn 4 with 50 laps to go, bringing out the fifth caution. Busch exited pit road with the race lead. Ricky Stenhouse Jr. restarted from the tail-end of the field for speeding on pit road.

Back to green with 46 to go, everyone was on the razor's edge of making it to the end on fuel (with a fuel run at Michigan falling roughly between 40 and 45 laps). That dilemma went out the window, however, when debris in Turn 2 brought out the sixth caution with 21 to go. Tony Stewart, co-owner of Stewart-Haas Racing, tweeted after the race it was "a shame that so many drivers and teams day was ruined by the results of another 'debris' caution towards the end of the race today."

Busch failed to fend off Larson on the restart with 15 to go and lost the lead to him going into Turn 1. Caution flew the following lap when Clint Bowyer tagged the wall in Turn 2. After the race, Bowyer said he was "sitting there seventh with 20 laps to go reeling them in thinking this was our day, and then a debris caution forces a restart (referencing the proceeding debris caution)." He added that restarts are realistically "the only times you can pass, so everyone was racing hard, and I got into the wall. It killed our day.”

On the following restart with 10 to go, a domino-effect stack-up rounding Turns 1 and 2 resulted in Danica Patrick being hit exiting Turn 2, sliding down the apron and slamming the inside wall on the backstretch, therefore bringing out the eighth and final caution.

Restarting with five to go, Denny Hamlin, who restarted aside Larson, lost the spot to Chase Elliott and third to Joey Logano. Larson held off Elliott in the closing laps to score the victory.

Race results

Stage results

Stage 1
Laps: 60

Stage 2
Laps: 60

Final stage results

Stage 3
Laps: 80

Race statistics
 Lead changes: 4 among different drivers
 Cautions/Laps: 8 for 34
 Red flags: 0
 Time of race: 2 hours, 47 minutes and 24 seconds
 Average speed:

Media

Television 
Fox NASCAR televised the race in the United States on FS1 for the third consecutive year. Mike Joy was the lap-by-lap announcer, while three-time Michigan winner, Jeff Gordon and two-time winner Darrell Waltrip were the color commentators. Jamie Little,  Chris Neville and Matt Yocum reported from pit lane during the race.

Radio 
Radio coverage of the race was broadcast by Motor Racing Network (MRN) and simulcasted on Sirius XM NASCAR Radio. Joe Moore, Jeff Striegle and five-time Michigan winner Rusty Wallace announced the race in the booth while the field is racing on the front stretch. Dave Moody called the race from a billboard outside of turn 2 when the field was racing through turns 1 and 2. Mike Bagley called the race from a platform outside of turn 3 when the field was racing through turns 3 and 4. Alex Hayden, Winston Kelley and Steve Post reported from pit lane during the race.

Standings after the race

Drivers' Championship standings

Manufacturers' Championship standings

Note: Only the first 16 positions are included for the driver standings.
. – Driver has clinched a position in the Monster Energy NASCAR Cup Series playoffs.

References

FireKeepers Casino 400
FireKeepers Casino 400
FireKeepers Casino 400
NASCAR races at Michigan International Speedway